Duhallow GAA is a Gaelic football and hurling division in the barony of Duhallow, County Cork, Ireland. This barony is situated in the northwest region of the county, and includes towns such as Kanturk, Millstreet, and Newmarket. It is one of eight divisions of Cork County Board. It organizes competitions for the clubs within the division, from Under 12 up to the adult level. The winners of these competitions compete against other divisional champions to determine which club is the county champion. In addition, the division selects football and hurling teams from the adult teams playing at junior level or county intermediate level, and these then compete for the Cork Senior Football Championship and Cork Senior Hurling Championship. Since hurling is the weaker sport in the division, a divisional team has also participated in the Cork Minor Hurling Championship and Cork Under-21 Hurling Championship.

Honours

Football 
Cork Senior Football Championship
  Winners (3): 1936, 1990, 1991
  Runners-Up (3):  1928, 1937, 1982, 1988, 1998, 2012, 2018, 2019

Hurling 
Cork Under-21 Hurling Championships
  Winners (8): 1982, 2009
  Runners-Up (13): 2008, 2010, 2011, 2012, 2015
 Cork Minor Hurling Championship
  Runners-Up (1): 2008

Member clubs

 Ballydesmond
 Banteer
 Boherbue
 Castlemagner
 Cullen
 Dromtarriffe
 Freemount
 Glenlara
 Kanturk
 Kilbrin
 Kiskeam
 Knocknagree
 Lismire
 Lyre
 Meelin
 Millstreet
 Newmarket
 Rockchapel
 St Johns
 Tullylease

Juvenile Amalgamations 
 BK Plunketts (Boherbue and Knocknagree)
 Dr Pat O'Callaghans (Banteer and Dromtarriffe)
 Duarigle Gaels (Cullen and Millstreet)
 Croke Rovers (Castlemagner and Kilbrin)
 Keale Gaels (Dromtarriffe and Millstreet)
 Robert Emmets (Lismire and Newmarket)
 Sliabh Luachra Gaels (Ballydesmond and Kiskeam)
 St Marks (Freemount and Meelin)
 St Peters (Freemount and Rockchapel)
 Wolfe Tones (Kanturk and Lismire)

Hurling

Hurling Competitions

Hurling Clubs

Grades

Football

Football Competitions

Football Clubs

Grades

References

Divisional boards of Cork GAA
Gaelic games clubs in County Cork
Gaelic football clubs in County Cork
Hurling clubs in County Cork